Zoltán Dudás (8 August 1933 – 13 September 1989) was a former Hungarian footballer. He won a bronze medal with the Hungarian national team at the 1960 Summer Olympics in Rome, Italy.

References

External links
 Zoltán Dudás at national-football-teams.com
 Zoltán Dudás at footballdatabase.eu

1933 births
1989 deaths
Sportspeople from Miskolc
Hungarian footballers
Hungary international footballers
Footballers at the 1960 Summer Olympics
Olympic footballers of Hungary
Olympic bronze medalists for Hungary
Olympic medalists in football
Medalists at the 1960 Summer Olympics
Diósgyőri VTK players
Budapest Honvéd FC players
Association football defenders